The Lind National Park is a national park in the East Gippsland region of Victoria, Australia.

See also

 Protected areas of Victoria

References

External links
Lind National Park on Parks Victoria website

National parks of Victoria (Australia)
Protected areas established in 1925
1925 establishments in Australia
East Gippsland